In linguistics, the topic, or theme, of a sentence is what is being talked about, and the comment (rheme or focus) is what is being said about the topic. This division into old vs. new content is called information structure. It is generally agreed that clauses are divided into topic vs. comment, but in certain cases the boundary between them depends on which specific grammatical theory is being used to analyze the sentence.

Topic, which is defined by pragmatic considerations, is a distinct concept from grammatical subject, which is defined by syntax. In any given sentence these may be the same, but they need not be. For example, in the sentence "As for the little girl, the dog bit her", the subject is "the dog" but the topic is "the little girl".

Topic and subject are also distinct concepts from agent (or actor)—the "doer", which is defined by semantics. In English clauses with a verb in the passive voice, for instance, the topic is typically the subject, while the agent may be omitted or may follow the preposition by. For example, in the sentence "The little girl was bitten by the dog", "the little girl" is the subject and the topic, but "the dog" is the agent.

In some languages, word order and other syntactic phenomena are determined largely by the topic–comment (theme–rheme) structure. These languages are sometimes referred to as topic-prominent languages. Korean and Japanese are often given as examples of this.

Definitions and examples 

The sentence- or clause-level "topic", or "theme", can be defined in a number of different ways. Among the most common are
the phrase in a clause that the rest of the clause is understood to be about,
a special position in a clause (often at the right or left-edge of the clause) where topics typically appear.

In an ordinary English clause, the subject is normally the same as the topic/theme (example 1), even in the passive voice (where the subject is a patient, not an agent: example 2):
The dog bit the little girl.
The little girl was bitten by the dog.

These clauses have different topics: the first is about the dog, and the second about the little girl.

In English it is also possible to use other sentence structures to show the topic of the sentence, as in the following:
As for the little girl, the dog bit her.
It was the little girl that the dog bit.

The case of expletives is sometimes rather complex. Consider sentences with expletives (meaningless subjects), like:

It is raining.
There is some room in this house.
There are two days in the year in which the day and the night are equal in length.

In these examples the syntactic subject position (to the left of the verb) is manned by the meaningless expletive ("it" or "there"), whose sole purpose is satisfying the extended projection principle, and is nevertheless necessary. In these sentences the topic is never the subject, but is determined pragmatically. In all these cases, the whole sentence refers to the comment part.

The relation between topic/theme and comment/rheme/focus should not be confused with the topic-comment relation in Rhetorical Structure Theory-Discourse Treebank (RST-DT corpus) where it is defined as "a general statement or topic of discussion is introduced, after which a specific remark is made on the statement or topic". For example: "[As far as the pound goes,] [some traders say a slide toward support at 1.5500 may be a favorable development for the dollar this week.]"

Realization of topic–comment 
Different languages mark topics in different ways. Distinct intonation and word-order are the most common means. The tendency to place topicalized constituents sentence-initially ("topic fronting") is widespread. Topic fronting refers to placing the topic at the beginning
of a clause regardless whether it is marked or not. Again, linguists disagree on many details.

Languages often show different kinds of grammar for sentences that introduce new topics and those that continue discussing previously established topics.

When a sentence continues discussing a previously established topic, it is likely to use pronouns to refer to the topic. Such topics tend to be subjects.  In many languages, pronouns referring to previously established topics will show pro-drop.

In English 
In English the topic/theme comes first in the clause, and is typically marked out by intonation as well. 

English is quite capable of using a topic-prominent formulation instead of a subject-prominent formulation when context makes it desirable for one reason or another. A typical pattern for doing so is opening with a class of prepositions such as as for, as regards, regarding, concerning, respecting, on, re, and others. Pedagogically or expositorily this approach has value especially when the speaker knows that they need to lead the listener's attention from one topic to another in a deftly efficient manner, sometimes actively avoiding misplacement of the focus of attention from moment to moment. But whereas topic-prominent languages might use this approach by default or obligately, in subject-prominent ones such as English it is merely an option that often is not invoked.

In other languages

 In Japanese and Korean, the topic is normally marked with a postposition like  or 는/은, -(n)eun.
 In Côte d'Ivoire French, the topic is marked by the postposition « là ». The topic can be but is not necessarily a noun or a nominal group: « Voiture-là est jolie deh » ; « Aujourd'hui-là il fait chaud » ; « Pour toi-là n'est pas comme pour moi hein » ; « Nous qui sommes ici-là, on attend ça seulement ».
 So-called free-word order languages like Russian, Czech and to some certain extent Chinese and German use word order as the primary means, and the topic usually precedes the focus. For example, in some Slavic languages like Czech and Russian, both orders are possible. The order with comment sentence-initial is referred as subjective (Vilém Mathesius invented the term and opposed it to objective) and expresses certain emotional involvement.  The two orders are distinguished by intonation.
 In Modern Hebrew, a topic may follow its comment. For example, the syntactic subject of this sentence is an expletive זה ("ze", lit. "this"):

 In American Sign Language, a topic can be declared at the beginning of a sentence (indicated by raised eyebrows and head tilt) describing the object, and the rest of the sentence describes what happens to that object.

Practical applications 
The main application of the topic-comment structure is in the domain of speech technology, especially the design of embodied conversational agents (intonational focus assignment, relation between information structure and posture and gesture). There were some attempts to apply the theory of topic/comment for information retrieval and automatic summarization.

History
The distinction between subject and topic was probably first suggested by Henri Weil in 1844. He established the
connection between information structure and word order. Georg von der Gabelentz distinguished psychological subject (roughly topic) and psychological object (roughly focus). In the Prague school, the dichotomy, termed topic–focus articulation, has been studied mainly by Vilém Mathesius, Jan Firbas, František Daneš, Petr Sgall and Eva Hajičová. They have been concerned mainly by its relation to intonation and word-order. Mathesius also pointed out that the topic does not provide new information but connects the sentence to the context. The work of Michael Halliday in the 1960s is responsible for developing linguistic science through his systemic functional linguistics model for English.

See also
Focus (linguistics)
Predicate (grammar)
Textual function (systemic functional linguistics)
Thematic equative
Topicalization
Topic marker
Topic-prominent language

References

Further reading

 Givón, Talmy. 1983a. Topic continuity in discourse: A quantitative cross-language study. Amsterdam: Arshdeep Singh.
 Hajičová, Eva, Partee, Barbara H., Sgall, Petr. 1998. Topic–Focus Articulation, Tripartite Structures, and Semantic Content. Studies in Linguistics and Philosophy 71. Dordrecht: Kluwer. (ix + 216 pp.) review
 Halliday, Michael A. K. 1967–68. "Notes on transitivity and theme in English" (Part 1–3). Journal of Linguistics, 3 (1). 37–81; 3 (2). 199–244; 4(2). 179–215. 
 Halliday, Michael A. K. (1970). "Language structure and language function." In J. Lyons (Ed.), New Horizons in Linguistics. Harmondsworth: Penguin, 140–65.  
 Hockett, Charles F. 1958. A Course in Modern Linguistics. New York: The Macmillan Company. (pp. 191–208)
 Mathesius, Vilém. 1975. A Functional Analysis of Present Day English on a General Linguistic Basis. edited by Josef Vachek, translated by Libuše Dušková. The Hague – Paris: Mouton.
 Kadmon, Nirit. 2001. Pragmatics Blackwell Publishers. Blackwell Publishers.
 Lambrecht, Knud. 1994. Information structure and sentence form. Cambridge: Cambridge University Press.
 Li, Charles N., Thompson, Sandra A. 1976. Subject and Topic: A New Typology of Languages, in: Li, Charles N. (ed.) Subject and Topic, New York/San Francisco/London: Academic Press, 457–90.
 Payne, Thomas E.  1997.  Describing morphosyntax: A guide for field linguists.  Cambridge: Cambridge University Press.
 Von der Gabelentz, Georg. 1891.  Die Sprachwissenschaft, ihre Aufgaben, Methoden und bisherigen Ergebnisse. Leipzig: T.O. Weigel Nachfolger.
 Weil, Henri. 1887. De l'ordre des mots dans les langues anciennes comparées aux langues modernes: question de grammaire générale. 1844. Published in English as The order of words in the ancient languages compared with that of the modern languages.

External links
 SFG page: theme – an explanation, for beginners, of theme in systemic functional grammar by Alvin Leong
 Iliev, Iv. The Russian Genitive of Negation and Its Japanese Counterpart. International Journal of Russian Studies. 1, 2018

Systemic functional linguistics
Word order
Linguistics
Dichotomies
Semantics